Kelly Cates (née Dalglish) is a Scottish presenter, currently working for Sky Sports, BBC Radio 5 Live, and ESPN.

Early life 
Born in Glasgow, Kelly is the eldest of four children of former Celtic and Liverpool player and manager Sir Kenny Dalglish and his wife Marina and grew up in Southport. Her brother Paul also had a professional football career. She also has two younger sisters, Lynsey and Lauren.

Career

Television 
Cates presented the news on The Biggest Breakfast Ever, the 8-hour Millennium special of The Big Breakfast. She was a presenter on Sky Sports News, and was part of the presenter line up for Virgin Media's new portal. She interviewed managers and footballers as part of Setanta's Premier League coverage in 2007, and was a presenter on Setanta Sports News.

In the 2009–10 football season, she was part of the ESPN team for their Premier League coverage and co-presented Talk of the Terrace alongside Mark Chapman and for Series 2, Nat Coombs.

In May 2010 she presented the sports news on GMTV in the absence of regular host Dan Lobb. Cates then worked as a reporter for ITV at the 2010 FIFA World Cup in South Africa as well as for the 2011–2012 UEFA Champions League.

In 2012 she presented the sports news on Daybreak in the absence of Gavin Ramjaun. She was part of the UK Channel 4 presenting team for the London 2012 Paralympics.

In the Autumn of 2012, Cates presented the six-part Scottish television series Coached Off the Couch for STV.

From the 2015/16 football season, Cates hosted Football League Tonight on Channel 5 with George Riley presenting weekly highlights from The Football League.

On 3 August 2016, Sky Sports announced that Cates had rejoined them to present their live coverage of the Sky Bet English Football League. From August 2017, Cates has switched from the EFL to become the host of Premier League matches notably Friday Night Football (FNF) and also on Saturday mornings (Premier League Live) on Sky Sports.

Cates returned part time to ESPN to cover Euro 2020.

Radio 
Cates was a regular presenter for national radio station talkSPORT, and hosted the Monday evening talk show between 7pm and 10pm alongside Jason Cundy.

Cates has presented Fighting Talk on Radio 5 Live, standing in for Colin Murray, and then presented on the station in Summer 2009 and since August 2013 presents the 606 show most Sundays alongside pundit Ian Wright. She also presents the midweek sports show, 5 Live Sport.

Personal life
Cates married Tom Cates in Glasgow in 2007; they separated in 2021. The couple have two daughters.

References

External links 
Biography – Virgin Media
606

Living people
BBC Radio 5 Live presenters
English people of Scottish descent
People educated at Merchant Taylors' Girls' School
Mass media people from Glasgow
Scottish sports broadcasters
Sky Sports presenters and reporters
Year of birth missing (living people)